MSC Marc is a nonlinear finite elements analysis software used to simulate behavior of complex materials and interaction under large deformations and strains. It can also simulate multi-physics scenarios across structural, thermal, piezoelectric, electrostatic, magnetostatic, and electromagnetic behaviors. It uses automatic two-dimensional and three-dimensional remeshing to analyze structures undergoing large distortions, and crack propagation.

History 

Marc was the first commercial nonlinear finite element software developed by Marc Analysis Research Corporation founded in 1971 by Dr. Pedro Marcal. It was acquired in 1999 by MSC Software Corporation. Mentat is the dedicated pre- and post-processor used to support Marc.

Introduction
Engineering structures and systems often use nonlinear materials and experience complex interactions between various parts. For example, the stress-strain curve of an elastomer is highly nonlinear.  During installation, elastomeric components could fold onto themselves and could undergo buckling. Their properties change with temperature and time. These nonlinearities are often grouped into three major categories, namely geometric, material and boundary condition nonlinearities. Marc is used to perform Finite Element Analysis of structures accounting for all these nonlinearities, in one, two and three dimensions.

Technology 
Marc can be used to run various types of mechanical simulations.
 Linear statics
 Linear dynamics
 Nonlinear statics
 Nonlinear dynamics
Buckling
 Heat transfer
Diffusion
 Electromagnetics
 Electrostatics
 Magnetostatics

Marc can also simulate coupled physical phenomena like:
 Themomechnical
 Electrical-Thermal-Mechanical
 Piezoelectric
Induction heating
 Thermal-Electrical (Joule heating)
 Magnetodynamic-Thermal
 Magnetostatic-Structural
 Magnetostatic-Thermal

Various constitutive formulations are used during simulations to represent the behavior of materials used in the designs. Marc can be used to model materials like:
Metals, below and above yield point
Composite materials
Gaskets
 Thermomechanical shape memory alloys
Soils
Powder metals
Concrete
Elastomers
Plastics

Applications 
Marc is used in several industries including automotive, aerospace, machinery, electronics, biomedical, oil and gas, consumer goods and packaging, manufacturing, civil engineering and mining to solve complex nonlinear problems that involve large deformations and strains, contact interaction, damage, fracture and failure.

See also
 MSC Software

References

External links
 
 MSC Software
 MSC Software's Blog
 MSC Software's YouTube Channel
 MSC Software on Twitter

Finite element software
Finite element software for Linux
Computer-aided manufacturing software
Computer-aided engineering software